Heimaey, is an Icelandic island. At , it is the largest island in the Vestmannaeyjar archipelago, and the largest and most populated island off the Icelandic coast. It is the only populated island of the Vestmannaeyjar islands, with a population of 4,414. The Vestmannaeyjar Airport and the Westman Islands Golf Club taken together cover a good portion of the island.

In January 1973, lava flow from nearby Eldfell destroyed half the town and threatened to close its harbour, its main income source. An operation to cool the advancing lava with sea water saved the harbour.

History 

Abducted from the north of Ireland, the slaves were called westmen (Vestmenn), as before discovering Iceland, Ireland was the most western part of the world known to northern Europeans then (c. 840). The slaves went ashore at Heimaey and took shelter in the hills. Ingólfur hunted them and killed them in revenge for their murdering his foster brother. In the process, he named various places and landmarks. For example, he named "Dufþekja", an area on Heimaklettur, Heimaey's highest hill, after the slave Dufþakur (the Icelandic version of the Gaelic 'Dubhthach,' Anglicized as 'Duffy') who was said to have thrown himself off Heimaklettur at that point, preferring to take his own life than to let Ingólfur take it.

First settlers 
In tradition, Herjólfur Bárðarson was said to be the first person to settle in Heimaey. According to the Landnáma, he built his farm in Herjólfsdalur (literally: Herjólf's valley) about 900. The archaeological excavation in 1971 of ancient ruins in Herjólfsdalur revealed that there had been settlement nearly 100 years earlier.

Turkish Raid 
In 1627, three Arab pirate ships from the Ottoman-controlled Barbary Coast raided several towns on the south coast of Iceland and outlying islands. They attacked Grindavík and Heimaey. In Grindavík, townspeople could flee into the lava field of Reykjanes and hide indefinitely.  Heimaey was so isolated that it was vulnerable and people suffered. Many heroic stories were told of the people who survived the invasion, most notably Guðríður Símonardóttir. Better known as Tyrkja-Gudda (Turkish-Gudda), she was taken by the pirates from her home at Stakkagerði on Heimaey to the slave market in Algeria. From there she bought her way back to Iceland through Tunisia, Italy and Denmark—Iceland was then under Danish rule. Upon returning to Iceland, she married the poet Hallgrímur Pétursson. The Hallgrímskirkja Lutheran church in Reykjavík is named in his honour.

Eldfell 

At 01:00 on 23 January 1973, a volcanic eruption of the mountain Eldfell began on Heimaey. The ground on Heimaey started to quake and fissures formed. Lava sprayed into the air from the fissures. Volcanic ash was blown to sea. Later, the situation deteriorated. When the fissures closed, the eruption converted to a concentrated lava flow that headed toward the harbour. The winds changed, and half a million cubic metres of ash blew on the town. During the night, the 5,000 inhabitants of the island were evacuated, mostly by fishing boats, as almost the entire fishing fleet was in dock.

The encroaching lava flow threatened to destroy the harbour. The eruption lasted until 3 July. Icelanders sprayed the lava with six million tons of cold seawater, causing some to solidify and much to be diverted, thus saving the harbour. During the eruption, half of the town was crushed and the island expanded in length. Only one man died in the eruption. The eruption is described by John McPhee in his book The Control of Nature.

Present day 
Heimaey is home to around 4,500 people, and eight million puffins
every summer. Many millions of other birds migrate there for breeding and feeding.

The island is connected to the rest of Iceland by a ferry and Vestmannaeyjar Airport.

Most people on the island live off fishing. During an annual festival, people are allowed to catch a few puffins to share at the festival, or to eat at home.

In popular culture 

 Some final shots of Chris Marker's film Sans Soleil are of stark white Heimaey houses slowly buried by the deep black volcanic ash of the eruption.  The backdrop reveals splashes of red lava as it flows into a steel-grey sea.
 Heimaey is mentioned in the song "Island" by American progressive-metal band Mastodon. The line is "Lava goddess, Ice and fire, Settling down, Ocean Geysir, Gullfoss, Heimaey 73."  This refers to the eruption of Eldfell.
 Keiko the whale from the Free Willy films was in real life flown to Klettsvik Bay on Heimaey as his final home before being freed.
 Ashes to Dust by Yrsa Sigurðardóttir (2007, English Translation 2011), the third of her murder mysteries set in Iceland, is largely set on Heimaey and focuses round the Eldfell eruption of 1973, and discoveries resulting from excavation, more than 30 years later, of a house buried in the volcanic ash.
 Heimaey features in Bruce McMillan's photo-illustrated children book Nights of the Pufflings (1995). In the story a tradition of rescuing young birds, pufflings, by local children is told. The pufflings take their first flight on August nights, and get accidentally stranded in the village streets. The children then set them free at the beach at daytime.
 The 1973 album Sumut by Greenlandic rock band Sumé features a song called "" (English: "Ode to Heimaey").

Gallery

References

External links 

 Vestmannaeyjar town council
 Travel info 
 All you need to know about Westman Islands
 Local newspaper
 Local newspaper
 Photos from Westman Islands 
 Photos
 VolcanoWorld page
 "Icelandic Kids Save Befuddled Puffins," National Geographic Today

Vestmannaeyjar
Islands of Iceland